This article contains information about the literary events and publications of 1877.

Events
January 24 – Émile Zola's L'Assommoir (sometimes translated as "The Dram Shop"), seventh in his novel sequence Les Rougon-Macquart, is first published in book format a few weeks after its serialisation ends in Le Bien public (Paris). It sells more than 50,000 copies by the end of the year.
February 24–March 17 – Robert Louis Stevenson's first published work of fiction, the novella "An Old Song", appears anonymously in four episodes in the magazine London. It was first attributed to Stevenson in 1980.
July – The ending of Leo Tolstoy's Anna Karenina is published in Russkiy vestnik.
July 15 – "Coppino Law" in Italy makes elementary schools mandatory, free and secular.
October – Robert Louis Stevenson publishes the short story "A Lodging for the Night" (in Temple Bar magazine), later collected in New Arabian Nights.
October 15 – Edward L. Wheeler's first story featuring Deadwood Dick, set on the American frontier, opens the first number of Beadle's Half-Dime Library, published in New York.
November 5 – The Mitchell Library is established in Glasgow.
November 14 – Henrik Ibsen's first contemporary realist drama The Pillars of Society is premièred at the Odense Teater (having been first published on October 11 in Copenhagen).
November 24 – Anna Sewell's novel Black Beauty, his grooms and companions: the autobiography of a horse "translated from the equine" is published by Jarrolds of Norwich in England. Her only book, published five months before her death arising from long-standing illness, it rapidly establishes its position as an all-time bestseller, going on to sell fifty million copies and becoming the sixth best seller in the English language.
December 30 – Swedish dramatist August Strindberg marries his mistress, the divorced actress Siri von Essen, a member of the Finnish-Swedish minor nobility.

New books

Fiction
R. M. Ballantyne – The Settler and the Savage
R. D. Blackmore – Erema; or, my father's sin
Ned Buntline – Buffalo Bill Trails the Devil Head
Bankim Chatterjee
Chandrasekhar
Rajani
Ion Creangă – Harap Alb
Fyodor Dostoevsky – "The Dream of a Ridiculous Man" (Сон смешного человека, short story)
Maria Fetherstonhaugh – Kilcorran
Gustave Flaubert – Three Tales
Henry James – The American
Jan Neruda – Povídky malostranské (Tales of the Little Quarter)
Margaret Oliphant – Carità
William Clark Russell – The Wreck of the Grosvenor
Theodor Storm – Aquis Submersus
Anthony Trollope
The American Senator
Is He Popenjoy?
Jacint Verdaguer – L'Atlàntida
Jules Verne
Hector Servadac
Les Indes noires
Émile Zola – L'Assommoir

Children and young people
Louisa May Alcott – Under the Lilacs
Mary Louisa Molesworth (Mrs. Molesworth) – The Cuckoo Clock
Anna Sewell – Black Beauty
Amy Catherine Walton (Mrs. O. F. Walton) – A Peep Behind the Scenes

Drama
James Albery – The Pink Dominos
José Echegaray – Saint or Madman? (O locura o santidad)
W. S. Gilbert – Engaged
Henrik Ibsen – The Pillars of Society (Samfundets støtter)
Adolphe L'Arronge – Hasemann's Daughters

Poetry
Edward Lear – Laughable Lyrics (published December 1876, dated 1877)
Stéphane Mallarmé – Poésies

Non-fiction
Henry Spencer Ashbee (as Pisanus Fraxi) – Index Librorum Prohibitorum: being Notes Bio- Biblio- Icono- graphical and Critical on Curious and Uncommon Books
Helena Blavatsky – Isis Unveiled
Florence Caddy – Household Organisation
Amelia Edwards – A Thousand Miles up the Nile
Henry Miers Elliot (ed. by John Dowson) – The History of India, as Told by Its Own Historians
Kenneth Mackenzie – Royal Masonic Cyclopedia
Lewis H. Morgan – Ancient Society
Shen Fu (沈復) – Six Records of a Floating Life (autobiography; first printed edition)

Births
January 4 – Sextil Pușcariu, Romanian linguist, philologist and journalist (died 1948)
February 7 – Alfred Williams, English "hammerman poet" (died 1930)
March 6 – Rose Fyleman, English writer and poet (died 1957)
April 14 – Donald Maxwell, English travel writer and illustrator (died 1936)
April 29 – Henri Stahl, Romanian historian, short story writer, memoirist and stenographer (died 1942)
June 11 – Renée Vivien, born Pauline Mary Tarn, English-born French-language Symbolist poet (died 1909)
July 2 – Hermann Hesse, German-Swiss poet, novelist and painter (died 1962)
August 27 – Lloyd C. Douglas, American novelist and pastor (died 1951)
September 1 – Rex Beach, American novelist and playwright (died 1949)
September 9 – James Agate, English diarist and critic (died 1947)
November 15 – William Hope Hodgson, English fiction writer (killed in action 1918)

Deaths
January 29 – Caroline Howard Jervey, American author, poet, and teacher (born 1823)
February 18 – Henrietta A. Bingham, American writer and editor (born 1841)
April – Ernst Moritz Ludwig Ettmüller, German philologist (born 1802)
June 15 – Caroline Norton (née Caroline Sheridan), English poet, pamphleteer and social reformer (born 1808)
June 17 – John Stevens Cabot Abbott, American historian and pastor (born 1805)
August 30 – Toru Dutt, multilingual Indian Bengali poet, novelist and translator, of pulmonary tuberculosis (born 1856)
September 12 – Emily Pepys, English child diarist (born 1833)
October 10 – Johann Georg Baiter, Swiss philologist and critic (born 1801)
October 16 – Théodore Barrière, French dramatist (born 1823)
October 28 – Julia Kavanagh, Irish novelist (born 1824)
December 12 – José de Alencar, Brazilian novelist (born 1829)

References

 
Years of the 19th century in literature